Oporelu is a commune in Olt County, Muntenia, Romania. It is composed of four villages: Beria de Jos, Beria de Sus, Oporelu and Rădești.

References

Communes in Olt County
Localities in Muntenia